Beelitz Stadt station is a railway station in the town of Beelitz located in the district of Potsdam-Mittelmark, Brandenburg, Germany.

References

Railway stations in Brandenburg
Railway stations in Germany opened in 1904
1904 establishments in Prussia
Buildings and structures in Potsdam-Mittelmark